The Texas Wildcatters, who took their name from Texas wildcatters, were a professional minor league ice hockey team in the ECHL based in Beaumont, Texas. They played their home games at the Ford Arena. The franchise previously played in Huntington, West Virginia, from 1993 to 2000 as the Huntington Blizzard playing at the Huntington Civic Arena. 

The Wildcatters relocated to Ontario, California, and were renamed Ontario Reign. The franchise's last game as the Wildcatters was a 1–4 loss to the Columbia Inferno on April 25, 2008, at Ford Arena.

History
During the 2004–05 season, they were affiliated with the Florida Panthers and the San Antonio Rampage.

On October 7, 2005, the Jefferson County, Texas, Commissioners announced that the team would not be allowed to use Ford Arena for the 2005–06 season because the site was being used for Hurricane Rita relief. There was no suitable temporary facility in the area, forcing the Wildcatters to cancel the season. They resumed play in 2006–07 as affiliates of the Minnesota Wild of the NHL and the AHL's Houston Aeros. After the 2007–08 season, the team moved to Ontario, California as the Ontario Reign and affiliated with the Los Angeles Kings.

According to a Beaumont TV report, there was a local group attempting to secure a Central Hockey League (CHL) franchise for Beaumont in time for the 2008–09 season. After the Austin Ice Bats suspended operations, there was an attempt to move that franchise to Ford Arena for 2008–09. However, there was insufficient time to do this before the CHL needed a commitment to play.

Season records

Regular season

Playoffs

References

External links
 Texas Wildcatters official site

Defunct ECHL teams
Houston Aeros (1994–2013)
Anaheim Ducks minor league affiliates
Minnesota Wild minor league affiliates
Ice hockey teams in Texas
Florida Panthers minor league affiliates
Sports in Beaumont, Texas
Defunct ice hockey teams in Texas
Ice hockey clubs established in 2003
Ice hockey clubs disestablished in 2008
2003 establishments in Texas
2008 disestablishments in Texas